WARC may refer to:
 WARC (FM), a radio station (90.3 FM) licensed to Meadville, Pennsylvania, United States
 Warren Ashby Residential College at Mary Foust Hall, a living-learning community located on the campus of The University of North Carolina at Greensboro
 Web ARChive, an ISO standard for web archiving
 West African Research Center
 World Administrative Radio Conference
 WARC bands, the world-wide amateur radio bands allocated during the above conference
 World Alliance of Reformed Churches
 The final call letters briefly used by radio station WGI at Medford Hillside, Massachusetts.